Nicholas Killas (born 8 February 1991) is a South African association football defender who plays for AEK Kouklia F.C. in the Cypriot First Division.

References

External links

1991 births
Living people
South African soccer players
Association football defenders
Mpumalanga Black Aces F.C. players